Mike Heffernan is a former Australian rules footballer who played with Collingwood in the Victorian Football League (VFL).

Notes

External links 

1939 births
Australian rules footballers from Victoria (Australia)
Collingwood Football Club players
Seymour Football Club players
Living people